Mexican Civil War may refer to:

Reform War (1857–1860), a civil war between the Liberal Party and the Conservative Party, resisting the legitimacy of the government 
Mexican Revolution (1910–1920), a national revolution including armed struggles that transformed Mexican culture and government
Cristero War (1926–1929), a struggle in central and western Mexico against articles of the 1917 Constitution

See also
Chiapas conflict, the 1994 Zapatista uprising and 1995 crisis, and ongoing tensions between indigenous peoples and subsistence farmers in Chiapas
Mexican Drug War, from 2006, ongoing asymmetric conflict between the Mexican government and drug trafficking syndicates